Raymond Joseph Louis Bouchex (25 January 1927 – 9 May 2010) was the Roman Catholic archbishop of the Roman Catholic Archdiocese of Avignon, France.

Ordained to the priesthood on 3 June 1950, Bouchex was appointed auxiliary bishop of the Roman Catholic Archdiocese of Aix on 23 February 1972 and was ordained bishop on 19 March 1972. On 25 April 1978 Bouchex was appointed archbishop of the Avignon Archdiocese retiring on 21 June 2002.

Notes

1927 births
2010 deaths
Archbishops of Avignon